Twice a Woman is a Canadian drama film, directed by François Delisle and released in 2010. The film stars Évelyne Rompré as Catherine, a woman fleeing an abusive marriage to start a new life.

The cast also includes Marc Béland, Marie Brassard, Brigitte Pogonat, Catherine De Léan, Michelle Rossignol and Martin Dubreuil.

The film received two Jutra Award nominations at the 13th Jutra Awards in 2011, for Best Actress (Rompré) and Best Makeup (Mélanie Turcotte, Mario Soucy).

References

External links

2010 films
2010 drama films
Canadian drama films
Films directed by François Delisle
Films shot in Quebec
French-language Canadian films
2010s Canadian films